Statistics of Belgian First Division in the 1961–62 season.

Overview

It was contested by 16 teams, and R.S.C. Anderlecht won the championship.

League standings

Results

References

Belgian Pro League seasons
Belgian
1961–62 in Belgian football